Samuel Livingston Mather (July 13, 1851 – October 18, 1931) was an American industrialist and philanthropist from Cleveland, Ohio.  He co-founded Pickands Mather and Company, a shipping and iron mining company which dominated these two Great Lakes industries from 1900 to 1960. For many years Mather was that city's richest citizen and a major philanthropist, contributing more than US$7 million to community-based organizations in the city.

Life and career
Samuel Livingston Mather was born July 13, 1851, in Cleveland, Ohio, to Samuel and Georgiana Pomeroy ( Woolson) Mather. He was a descendant of Rev. Richard Mather, an Englishman who emigrated to North America in 1635.  His ancestors were Samuel Mather, Cotton Mather, and Increase Mather. His grandfather Samuel Mather, Jr. (1745-1809 ) was one of the original founders and shareholders in the Connecticut Land Company, which bought the Connecticut Western Reserve (which constituted what later became northern Ohio) in 1792. His father, Samuel Livingston Mather (1817-1890) emigrated to the Western Reserve in 1843 at the age of 26, and in 1847 founded the Cleveland Iron Company. Samuel had one sister, Katherine Livingston Mather (born September 1853). His mother died two months after giving birth to Katherine, and his father then married Elizabeth L. Gwinn in June 1856. Mather's half-brother, William Gwinn Mather, was born in 1857.

Mather was educated in Cleveland's public schools, attending Cleveland High School before transferring to and graduating from St. Mark's School in Southborough, Massachusetts in 1869. Mather intended to attend Harvard University, but while working as a timekeeper in one of his father's mines in Ishpeming, Michigan, a premature explosion left him with a fractured skull, broken left arm, and a spinal injury. He spent the next three years convalescing (although the arm was left permanently stiff). He spent several months traveling in Europe in 1872 and returned to Cleveland in 1873, where he became an executive in his father's company.

In 1881, Mather married Flora Stone, daughter of Cleveland industrialist and railroad magnate Amasa Stone. The couple spent nearly two years traveling in Europe before returning to Cleveland. The couple had four children: Samuel Livingston Mather (born 1882), Amasa Stone Mather (born 1884), Constance (1889), and Philip Richard Mather (1894).

In 1883, Mather co-founded Pickands Mather and Company with James Pickands and Jay C. Morse. Pickands had risen to the rank of colonel in the 124th Ohio Volunteer Infantry during the American Civil War. In 1867, he moved to Marquette, Michigan, where he opened a hardware store selling tools and supplies to iron mining companies. He opened a fuel coal supply business three years later. He was elected mayor of Marquette in 1875, and five years later formed the Taylor Iron Co. (an iron mining concern) with Jay C. Morse. After Pickands' wife died in 1882, he moved to Cleveland. Jay C. Morse was a shipping agent for the Cleveland Iron Mining Company in Marquette.  He invested widely in Michigan iron mines, and by 1882 was a wealthy man ready to form his own company. Determined to make his own fortune and impress his father-in-law after his return from Europe, Mather sought out business partners. Pickands Mather and Company was formed in 1883, dealing in iron ore and pig iron, and mining iron ore from two mines in the Marquette Iron Range.

Pickands Mather became one of the four major iron ore companies in the United States through the operation of extensive mines in the Lake Superior region. By providing ample access to iron ore, steel, and shipping, Mather became increasingly wealthy through the profits reaped by the company and through the inheritance left to him from his father.

Charitable works
Mather gave generously to educational and health institutions throughout his life. During the First World War he raised US$4.5 million for the Red Cross and financed the sending of a unit of Lakeside Hospital to France. Mather also served as a trustee of Western Reserve University for forty-five years, contributing to the provision of residential accommodation and additional classroom facilities benefiting women students. Other gifts included the installation of Anne's Tablet on Mackinac Island, Michigan.

At Kenyon College, Mather was known for decades for his generous financial gifts and management of the college's financial affairs. Mather was a trustee to Kenyon for forty-three years; before his death, Mather was the oldest living member of Kenyon's Board of Trustees. According to Kenyon College, Mather donated over a half-million dollars to the school while he served as a trustee there. His largest single financial gift to the school was $100,000 in 1922 for the building of Leonard Hall. (He made this contribution anonymously.)

The Old Main Library at Rikkyo University, Tokyo was financed by Mather in 1918. The library was named in honor of his father Samuel Livingston Mather, who was a long time supporter of overseas mission activities of the Episcopal Church.

Death and legacy
Mather suffered from heart problems at the end of his life. His heart began to fail on October 10, 1931, and he died of heart disease on October 18.

Mather left $100,000 in his will to Kenyon College. The Samuel Mather Science Hall was built in Mather's name at the request of his business associate Henry G. Dalton, who gave money to Kenyon for the construction of the building.  Seven Great Lakes merchant ships have been named in Mather's honor.

Perhaps his greatest legacy is the Mather Mansion at Cleveland State which has survived the wrecking ball many times.

References

Bibliography

External links
Samuel Mather – KCpedia at www.kenyonhistory.net

American Episcopalians
American philanthropists
Burials at Lake View Cemetery, Cleveland
Businesspeople from Cleveland
St. Mark's School (Massachusetts) alumni
Members of the Kenyon College Board of Trustees
1851 births
1931 deaths